Paeonia kesrouanensis is a species of peony native to Syria, Turkey and Lebanon.  It is very similar to P. mascula, bearing rose-red flowers.

It is easily recognizable by its glabrous carpels and a long coiled stigma at the top.

References

kesrouanensis